The 2023–24 Eredivisie will be the 68th season of Eredivisie, the premier football competition in the Netherlands. It will begin on 11 or 13 August 2023 and will conclude on 19 May 2024.

Teams

Stadiums and locations

Standings

League table

References

External links

Eredivisie seasons
2023–24 in Dutch football
Netherlands
Netherlands